Hélder Carlos Muianga (born 28 September 1976) is a Mozambican retired footballer who played in Mozambique for Costa do Sol and Desportivo de Maputo, in South Africa for Manning Rangers, Black Leopards,  Dynamos FC and Jomo Cosmos, and in Hungary for Budapest Honvéd. Muianga also won 30 caps for the Mozambican national side between 1997 and 2004.

After retiring as a player in 2008, Muianga joined the Jomo Cosmos coaching technical team. The Federação Moçambicana de Futebol (FMF) terminated its contract with Dutch selector coach Mart Nooij in September 2011 after the national team failed to qualify for the African Cup, but Hélder Muianga e João Chissano were retained.

References

External links

1976 births
Living people
Budapest Honvéd FC players
Mozambican footballers
Mozambique international footballers
GD Maputo players
Mozambican expatriate footballers
Expatriate footballers in Hungary
Mozambican expatriate sportspeople in South Africa
Mozambican expatriate sportspeople in Hungary
Sportspeople from Maputo
Jomo Cosmos F.C. players
Expatriate soccer players in South Africa
Black Leopards F.C. players
Manning Rangers F.C. players
CD Costa do Sol players
Nemzeti Bajnokság I players
Association football defenders
Dynamos F.C. (South Africa) players